Jonathan Krause may refer to:

 Jon Krause (born 1981), Australian politician
 Jonathan Krause (American football) (born 1992), American football wide receiver